Siyakh Darengun Rural District is a rural district (dehestan) in the Central District of Shiraz County, Fars Province, Iran. At the 2006 census, its population was 10,890, in 2,503 families.  The rural district has 29 villages.

References 

Rural Districts of Fars Province
Shiraz County